Ward 13 Toronto Centre is a municipal electoral division in Toronto, Ontario, for the Toronto City Council. It was last contested in the 2022 municipal election, with Chris Moise elected councillor for the 2022–2026 term.

History 
The ward was created in 2018 when the provincial government aligned Toronto's then-44 municipal wards with the 25 corresponding provincial and federal ridings. The current ward is made up of parts of the former Ward 27 Toronto Centre-Rosedale and the former Ward 28 Toronto Centre-Rosedale.

2018 municipal election 
Ward 13 was first contested during the 2018 municipal election, with candidates including Ward 27 incumbent Kristyn Wong-Tam, Ward 28 incumbent Lucy Troisi and former Ontario deputy premier George Smitherman. Wong-Tam was ultimately elected with 51.26 per cent of the vote. Robin Buxton Potts, was appointed by council in June 2022 to serve the remainder of the term after Wong-Tam resigned to run in the 2022 provincial election.

2022 municipal election 
Chris Moise was elected in 2022.

Geography 
Ward 13 is part of the Toronto and East York community council.

Toronto Centre's approximate borders are Bay Street, College Street, Yonge Street and Dundas Street on the west, and The Esplanade on the south side. The Don River is the east boundary, and Rosedale Valley Road, Bloor Street, Mount Pleasant Road and Charles Street form the north border. The ward covers the heart of Downtown Toronto.

The ward contains areas such as Regent Park (Canada's first social housing development), St. James Town (a largely immigrant area and the most densely populated neighbourhood in Canada), Cabbagetown, Church and Wellesley (a historic LGBT neighbourhood), Toronto Metropolitan University, the Toronto Eaton Centre and part of the city's financial district (the east side of Bay Street).

Councillors

Election results

See also 

 Municipal elections in Canada
 Municipal government of Toronto
 List of Toronto municipal elections

References

External links 

 Councillor's webpage

Toronto city council wards
2018 establishments in Ontario